Paludomus is a genus of tropical freshwater snails with an operculum, aquatic gastropod mollusks in thesubfamily Paludominae of the family Paludomidae. 

Paludomus is the type genus of the family Paludomidae.

Species
15 Species of the genus Paludomus have been listed in the 2010 IUCN Red List of Threatened Species.

Species within the genus Paludomus include:

 Paludomus aborensis Godwin-Austen, 1918
 Paludomus ajanensis Morelet, 1860
 Paludomus andersoniana Nevill, 1877
 Paludomus annandalei Preston, 1909
 Paludomus blanfordiana Nevill, 1877
 Paludomus bogani Thach & F. Huber, 2021
 Paludomus burmanica Nevill, 1877
 Paludomus chilinoides Reeve, 1847
 Paludomus cincta Liu, Zhang & Duan, 1994
 Paludomus crassa (von dem Busch, 1842)
 Paludomus dhuma Rao, 1925
 Paludomus everetti E. A. Smith, 1894
 Paludomus franzhuberi Thach, 2021
 Paludomus globulosa (Gray in Reeve, 1847) 
 † Paludomus gracilis (Krause, 1897) 
 Paludomus hanleyi Dohrn, 1858
 Paludomus inflata Brot, 1880
 † Paludomus infraeocaenica Cossmann, 1892 
 Paludomus loricata Reeve, 1847
 Paludomus lutea H. Adams, 1874
 Paludomus messageri (Bavay & Dautzenberg, 1900)
 Paludomus nana Nevill, 1881
 Paludomus neritoides Reeve, 1847
 Paludomus obesa (Philippi, 1847)
 Paludomus ornata Benson, 1856
 Paludomus palawanicus Brot, 1891
 Paludomus palustris Layard, 1855
 Paludomus parvula Rao, 1929
 Paludomus petrosa (A. Gould, 1844) 
 † Paludomus praecursor F. Sandberger, 1870 
 Paludomus punctata Reeve, 1854
 Paludomus pustulosa Annandale, 1925
 Paludomus qianensis Liu, Duan & Zhang, 1994
 Paludomus regulata Benson, 1856
 Paludomus reticulata Blanford, 1870
 Paludomus rotunda W. T. Blanford, 1870
 Paludomus siamensis W. T. Blanford, 1903 
 † Paludomus sincenyensis Cossmann, 1902 
 Paludomus solida Dohrn, 1857
 Paludomus stephanus Benson, 1836
 Paludomus stomatodon (Benson, 1862)
 Paludomus subfasciata E. von Martens, 1908
 † Paludomus suraiensis Gurung, 1998 
 Paludomus swainsoni Dohrn, 1857
 Paludomus tanschaurica (Gmelin, 1791)
 Paludomus trifasciata Reeve, 1854
 † Paludomus triticea (A. Férussac in Deshayes, 1825) 
 † Paludomus vauvillei (Cossmann, 1886)

Synonyms
 Paludomus conica Gray, 1834: synonym of Paludomus crassa (von dem Busch, 1842) (based on invalid original name)
 Paludomus sulcatus Reeve, 1847: synonym of Philopotamis sulcatus (Reeve, 1847) (original combination)

References

Further reading 
 Layard E. L. (1854). "Observations on the Genus Paludomus of Swainson, with Descriptions of several New Species, and the Description of a New Species of Anculotus". Proceedings of the Zoological Society of London (for 1854)22: 87–94.

External links

Paludomidae